1989 Soviet Second League Finals were taken place when all competitions in each nine zones (groups) of the league. Winners of each zone proceeded to the finals and were split in three groups of three participants. The group winners would receive the actual promotion to the 1990 Soviet First League.

Group 1

Group 2

Group 3

Top goalscorers

The following were the top ten goalscorers.

See also
 Soviet Second League

External links
 1989 Soviet Second League. RSSSF website

1989
3
Soviet
Soviet